Marlon Joseph Fossey (born November 9, 1998) is an American professional soccer player who plays as a right-back for Belgian First Division A club Standard Liège.

Early and personal life
Born in Los Angeles, California, Fossey moved to his mother's birthplace, the island of Jersey, with his family at age 4. At age 11, he moved to England. As a result, he holds dual American and British citizenships.

Club career
Fossey began his youth career with Fulham at the age of 11 after being spotted by a club scout while playing in a youth tournament in Jersey, however his youth career was marred by injury. He moved on loan to Shrewsbury Town in August 2020. He made his debut for The Shrews on September 4, coming on as an 81st minute substitution for Donald Love in a 4–3 away defeat at Middlesbrough in the EFL Cup. On December 29, 2020 it was announced that his loan deal had ended.

He signed a new two-year contract with Fulham in June 2021. On January 3, 2022, Fossey joined Bolton Wanderers on loan for the remainder of the 2021–22 season. He turned down an offer from Inter Miami, preferring to sign for Bolton on loan instead. On March 18 it was confirmed that Fossey had returned to Fulham after a torn meniscus in his left knee, that he suffered the previous weekend against Plymouth Argyle, had ended his season.

In September 2022 he signed for Belgian club Standard Liège.

International career
Fossey has represented the United States at under-20 youth level. He also holds UK citizenship.

Playing style
Fossey began his career as a winger but was converted into a full back, playing primarily on the right.

Career statistics

Honors
United States U20
CONCACAF Under-20 Championship: 2017

References

1998 births
Living people
Association football fullbacks
American soccer players
United States men's under-20 international soccer players
American people of Jersey descent
Fulham F.C. players
Shrewsbury Town F.C. players
Bolton Wanderers F.C. players
Standard Liège players
English Football League players
American expatriate soccer players
American expatriate sportspeople in England
Expatriate footballers in England
American expatriate sportspeople in Belgium
Expatriate footballers in Belgium
Belgian Pro League players